Susanna (minor planet designation: 542 Susanna) is a minor planet orbiting the Sun.

References

External links
 
 

Background asteroids
Susanna
Susanna
Susanna
S-type asteroids (Tholen)
19040815